Generation Hex may refer to:
 Generation Hex, a book coauthored by Dillon Burroughs and Marla Alupoaicei
 "Generation Hex" (Charmed), an episode of the television series Charmed
 Generation Hex, a book written by Jason Louv and published by The Disinformation Company
 Generation Hex, an Amalgam Comics series, featuring Generation Hex a team combining elements of DC Comics' Wild West characters and Marvel Comics' Generation X
 The generation of kids who grew up with the Harry Potter novels and/or movies.